Germ de Jong (8 March 1886 – 11 April 1967) was a Dutch painter. De Jong studied art at Quellinus, a school for the poor. In 1918 de Jong’s gets his first solo-exhibition, all his works are sold in ten days. When de Jong’s also won the Willink van Collen award for young artists his reputation was made. De Jong moved to Paris, where he became acquainted to Picasso, Mondriaan, Jos Crion, Conrad Kickert and Simon Carmiggelt. Among de Jong’s paintings were many colourful still lifes, focusing mostly on colourful depictions of flowers. His work was included in the 1939 exhibition and sale Onze Kunst van Heden (Our Art of Today) at the Rijksmuseum in Amsterdam.

References 

1886 births
1967 deaths
Modern painters
Dutch expatriates in France
Dutch male painters
20th-century Dutch artists
20th-century Dutch painters
20th-century Dutch male artists